The 1969 BYU Cougars football team was an American football team that represented Brigham Young University (BYU) as a member of the Western Athletic Conference (WAC) during the 1969 NCAA University Division football season. In their sixth season under head coach Tommy Hudspeth, the Cougars compiled an overall record of 6–4 with a mark of 4–3 against conference opponents, tied for third place in the WAC, and outscored opponents by a total of 186 to 158.

Schedule

Roster

References

BYU
BYU Cougars football seasons
BYU Cougars football